Pyroderces apicinotella is a moth in the family Cosmopterigidae. It is found in Tunisia, Libya and Iraq.

The wingspan is 8–9 mm. Adults have been recorded in May.

References

Moths described in 1915
apicinotella